This is a list of initiated and honorary members of Sigma Nu, an American fraternity.

Founders

Entertainment

Government

Sports

Other notable alumni

References

Sigma Nu
Sigma Nu